The Cook of Castamar is a Spanish period drama television series adapting the novel of the same name by Fernando J. Muñez which stars Michelle Jenner and Roberto Enríquez. Set in early 18th-century Madrid, the plot follows the love story between an agoraphobic cook and a widowed nobleman. Produced by Buendía Estudios, it  originally aired on Atresplayer Premium from February to May 2021.

Premise 
The fiction is set in 1720 in Madrid, during the reign of Philip V. After losing her father, Clara Belmonte (Michelle Jenner) develops agoraphobia and takes refuge in the kitchens, where she feels safe. She starts working as a cook in the kitchens of the Duke of Castamar (Roberto Enríquez), marked by the tragedy of his pregnant wife's death.

Cast 
 Michelle Jenner as Clara Belmonte.
 Roberto Enríquez as Diego de Castamar, Duke of Castamar.
 Hugo Silva as Enrique de Arcona, Marquis of Soto and Campomedina.
 María Hervás as Amelia Castro.
 Fiorella Faltoyano as Doña Mercedes, Duchess of Rioseco.
  as Gabriel de Castamar.
 Paula Usero as Elisa Costa.
 Maxi Iglesias as Francisco Marlango, Count of Armiño.
 Mónica López as Úrsula Berenguer.
 Óscar Rabadán as Melquíades Elquiza.
 Nancho Novo as Hernaldo de la Marca.
 Silvia Abascal as Queen Isabel Farnesio.
 Marina Gatell as Sol Montijos.
 Carlos Serrano-Clark as Ignacio.
  as King Philip.
  as Beatriz Ulloa.
  as Alba.
Raúl Ferrando as Carlo Broschi (aka Farinelli)

Production 

La cocinera de Castamar is an adaptation of the novel of the same name by Fernando J. Muñez. Produced by Buendía Estudios, created by Tatiana Rodríguez and directed by Iñaki Peñafiel and Norberto López Amado, the series was shot in outdoor locations in Madrid, Segovia and Cuenca. The Duke's palace, Castamar, is depicted by Palacio del Infante Don Luis in Boadilla del Monte. Filming took 4 months and ended in December 2020. The series consists of 12 episodes with a running time of roughly 50 minutes. The score is composed by Iván Palomares.

Release and reception 
The series premiered on 21 February 2021 on Atresplayer Premium. The weekly free-to-air broadcasting run on Antena 3 lasted from 8 April to 24 June 2021, attaining good audience ratings after adding up catch-up viewership figures to the regular linear TV figures (11.8% audience share).

Plot summary 
 

After losing his beloved wife, Alba, in a riding accident during her early pregnancy, Diego, Duke of Castamar, has become reclusive, refusing to end his mourning period two years later. The King of Spain, along with Diego’s mother, Mercedes, are concerned and want Diego to return to service with the royal council. The King convinces Diego to throw a gala at Castamar to mark the end of his mourning, and Mercedes, along with Marquis Enrique de Arcona, conspire to make a match between Diego and a young woman named Amelia Castro. Mercedes invites Amelia to stay at Castamar, hoping that her son will fall in love with her. She is unaware that Enrique has Amelia under his control, and is hoping to use her as an inside woman to bring down Diego, whom he hates for marrying the woman he loved. 

Meanwhile, Clara Belmonte, an orphan who has suffered agoraphobia since her father’s death in the war, is advised by Fray Juan, a monk and friend of her father, to take a job in the kitchens at Castamar - she has to use laudanum to make the journey without being overcome by fear. She befriends Rosalía, a ward of Diego’s with a learning disability. Shortly after Clara’s arrival, the housekeeper catches the head cook having an illicit affair and fires her; Clara, who has loved cooking all her life and is extremely talented, takes over. The meal is impressive, and Clara is promoted to head cook. Upstairs at the party, Lady Sol Montijos continues her affair with the young Francisco Marlango under the nose of her elderly husband; Diego’s friend Alfredo also continues an affair with Ignatio, a friend of Enrique, against his own better judgement. Enrique sleeps with Amelia, causing her to fall pregnant; Amelia confides in Sol, and Enriques uses the affair as further leverage to force Amelia on Diego. 

When the king goes missing on his way to the party, Clara finds him in the wine cellar, in the midst of a psychotic episode; maddened by guilt, he believes he should not be king and hands Clara a letter of abdication as she nurses him. She and Diego attempt to keep all this hidden, but the queen instructs Diego’s butler, Melquíades Elquiza, who is a spy of hers, to find the letter. Diego discovers Elquiza’s prying and chooses instead to go to the queen himself; she agrees to keep the secret. 

Having accepted the role of Secretary of the Council, Diego begins to fall in love, not with Amelia, but with Clara. Meanwhile, Amelia is plagued by an impatient Enrique, who is being blackmailed by Lady Sol - the only other person who knows that he impregnated Amelia - to kill her husband in exchange for her silence on the matter. Amelia finds solace in Diego’s brother, Gabriel, whom she initially snubbed due to his black ancestry. He rescues her from a suicide attempt, but she continues to hide the truth from him, turning instead to Sol, who helps her drug Diego and stage a sexual encounter. Believing he has compromised her honour, Diego agrees to marry her. Meanwhile, Clara is left reeling at the discovery that her father is still alive, in hiding due to a false claim of murder against him. 

Tragedy strikes when Rosalía dies during a visit from a popular castrato singer. Clara, who had promised to care for her, is wracked with guilt, bringing her closer to Diego. Sol becomes increasingly desperate to escape her husband, who is close to discovering her affair with Francisco. With Amelia’s future apparently secure, Enrique arranges the murder, but frames Francisco in the process; to keep her involvement quiet, Sol is forced to kill Francisco herself. Enrique also attempts to drive Clara out by revealing that her father is to be hanged for murder. Distraught, Clara gets lost out in a storm and is very ill for several days; Diego rescues and nurses her, and confesses his love for her; he is ready to give up his title to marry her, but when the king and queen find out, Amelia’s pregnancy is revealed to him to ensure that he remains loyal to her, as he believes he is the father. 

Gabriel, suspecting that Enrique and Sol have blackmail material on Amelia, begins to investigate; however, Enrique, seeing him as a threat, arranges for him to be kidnapped and sold into slavery. While Clara and Diego search for evidence that can acquit her father and save him from execution, kitchen worker Beatriz discovers that her lover, Leftie - a former employee at Castamar, who trained Alba’s horse to kill her on Sol’s command - has been involved in the kidnap of Gabriel. She reveals this information to Alfredo shortly before being killed. Sol reveals her work in the death of Alba to Enrique, who loved Alba and always believed that her death was a mishap in his own, similar plan to kill Diego; she then attempts to leave the country, but is later found dead. Diego succeeds in getting information from Leftie and is able to rescue Gabriel. As Diego searches for Enrique, the latter reveals Alfredo and Ignacio’s affair publicly, and only Ignacio escapes the law.

Upon finding Enrique, Diego challenges him to a duel; Clara discovers this and overcomes her agoraphobia to go after him. He is badly injured, so she takes his dagger and kills Enrique. As Diego recovers, Gabriel asks Amelia to run away with him, but she refuses and the wedding is set to go ahead. The execution of Clara’s father is also going ahead; Clara prepares to go, and, on Amelia’s suggestion, decides not to return to Castamar afterwards. Diego confesses to the king that he killed Enrique, and why; instead of arresting him, the king thanks him and asks him to educate his son, Prince Luis. When Diego accepts, the king offers him a favour, and Diego asks him to pardon Clara’s father, who is saved just in time. Just before the wedding, the Castamar family discover the truth about Amelia’s child, and the wedding is cancelled. Six months later, Gabriel goes to visit a desolate Amelia, who has given birth, and promises to take care of her and her child. Clara, who has published her cookbook, is enjoying a comfortable life with her father - upon seeing a copy of the book, Diego gives up the Duchy of Castamar so he can finally marry her.

Episodes

Awards and nominations 

|-
| rowspan = "7" align = "center" | 2021 || rowspan = "4" | 23rd Iris Awards || colspan = "2" | Best Fiction ||  || rowspan = "4" | 
|-
| Best Production || Ana Rocha || 
|-
| Best Actress || Michelle Jenner ||  
|-
| Best Actor || Roberto Enríquez ||  
|-
| rowspan="3" | 5th  || Best Leading Actor in a Series or Miniseries || Roberto Enríquez ||   || rowspan= "3" | 
|-
| Best Supporting Actress in a Series or Miniseries || María Hervás || 
|-
| Best New Actress || Anna Cortés || 
|-
| rowspan = "3" align = "center" | 2022 || rowspan = "3" | 30th Actors and Actresses Union Awards || Best Television Actress in a Leading Role || Michelle Jenner ||  || rowspan = "3" | 
|-
| Best Television Actress in a Minor Role || Roser Pujol || 
|-
| Best New Actor || Jean Cruz || 
|}

References

External links
 

Television series set in the 18th century
Television shows set in Madrid
Television shows filmed in Spain
2021 Spanish television series debuts
2021 Spanish television series endings
2020s Spanish drama television series
Atresplayer Premium original programming
Television series based on Spanish novels
Spanish-language television shows
Television series by Buendía Estudios